Vestia gulo is a species of air-breathing land snail, a terrestrial pulmonate gastropod mollusk in the family Clausiliidae, the door snails, all of which have a clausilium.

Distribution
This species occurs in:
 The Czech Republic - in Moravia only
 Ukraine

References

External links

Clausiliidae
Gastropods described in 1859